David Copperfield is a 1922 Danish drama film directed by A.W. Sandberg and starring Gorm Schmidt, Martin Herzberg and Margarete Schlegel.

The film's sets were designed by the art director Carlo Jacobsen.

Plot
For a detailed plot, see David Copperfield (novel).

Cast
 Gorm Schmidt as David Copperfield som voksen  
 Martin Herzberg as David Copperfield som barn  
 Margarete Schlegel as David Copperfields mor  
 Karen Winther as Agnes som voksen  
 Else Nielsen as Agnes som barn  
 Poul Reumert as Sagfører Wickfield, Agnes' far  
 Frederik Jensen as Mr. Micawber  
 Anne-Marie Wiehe as Mrs. Micawber  
 Karina Bell as Dora Spenlow  
 Robert Schmidt as Mr. Murdstone  
 Ellen Rovsing as Miss Murdstone  
 Marie Dinesen as Tante Betsy  
 Karen Caspersen as Pegotty  
 Charles Wilken as Mr. Chillip  
 Rasmus Christiansen as Uriah Heep 
 Peter Malberg as Mr. Dick 
 Mathilde Nielsen

References

Bibliography
 Glavin, John. Dickens on Screen. Cambridge University Press, 2003.

External links
 
 

1922 films
1920s historical drama films
1920s Danish-language films
Danish silent films
Danish historical drama films
Films based on David Copperfield
Films directed by A. W. Sandberg
Films set in England
Films set in the 19th century
Danish black-and-white films
Films set in London
Nordisk Film films
1922 drama films
Silent historical drama films